Amistad Dam (Spanish: Presa la Amistad) is a major embankment dam across the Rio Grande between Texas, United States, and Coahuila, Mexico. Built to provide irrigation water storage, flood control, and hydropower generation, it is the largest dam along the international boundary reach of the Rio Grande.

The dam is owned and operated by the International Boundary and Water Commission (IBWC), and also facilitates the Amistad Dam Port of Entry. Amistad is derived from the Spanish word for "friendship", representing the two nations' cooperation on the dam.

History
Because of the Rio Grande's frequent floods and droughts, the sharing of its water between the US and Mexico has been a contentious issue since the 1800s. The 1906 Treaty for Equitable Distribution of the Waters of the Rio Grande enabled the construction of Elephant Butte Dam, the first major Rio Grande dam, in New Mexico. While this benefited water users along the middle Rio Grande, it did little to help the lower Rio Grande Valley, where water flows remained uncontrolled. The 1944 Treaty relating to the utilization of waters of the Colorado and Tijuana Rivers and of the Rio Grande authorized the IBWC to build dams on the uncontrolled border segment of the Rio Grande. The first dam to be completed under the treaty was Falcon Dam in 1953.

After the Rio Grande flooded massively in 1954, with a peak flow of  recorded at Del Rio, planners realized that a much larger dam would be needed to control the river and two unregulated tributaries, the Pecos and Devils Rivers. During the initial planning stage, it was known as "Diablo Reservoir", a nod to the name of Devils River (diablo meaning "devil" in Spanish). The final design was approved by the two governments as Minute 207, and authorized by an act of U.S. Congress on July 7, 1960. Work at the dam site began in August 1963 with foundation drilling and grouting in the river bed to support the future concrete section of the dam. Actual construction of the dam itself began in January 1965 and water was first impounded in 1968. U.S. president Richard Nixon and Mexican president Gustavo Díaz Ordaz dedicated the dam in 1969.

When the reservoir filled, it inundated ancient rock art left by Native Americans who once lived in the areas. More than 170 archaeological sites were cataloged during salvage operations between 1958 and 1969, a difficult undertaking due to the arid and remote conditions of the area.

The hydroelectric power plants were added later, with the US plant completed in 1983 and the Mexican plant in 1987. Of the dam's roughly US$125 million cost, the US paid about 57% and Mexico 43%, in accordance with the division of water storage rights in the reservoir. 

Specifications

Dam and spillways
In total, the dam contains 13.5 million cubic yards (10,300,000 m3) of earth, 1.8 million cubic yards (1,400,000 m3) of concrete, 1.76 million cubic yards (1,300,000 m3) of riprap, and 12,500 tons (11,300 metric tons) of steel.

The embankments are protected on both sides by riprap to reduce erosion. Because the dam is founded on karstic limestone of the Georgetown formation, a very deep grout curtain was extended underground to block seepage and the risk of dam failure by internal erosion. However, because the water is traveling through bedrock and not the dam itself, this poses little threat to the dam's structural stability. During extreme flood events, however, this may still be a cause for concern.

Flood waters are released through a concrete ogee crest spillway with 16 tainter gates.

Water supply and flood control
It is one of the largest lakes in the Rio Grande system by both surface area and volume. Of the reservoir's  capacity, 61% is dedicated to water conservation and sediment control, 32% to flood control, and 7% to surcharge (flood storage above the top of the spillway gates, but below the crest of the dam). At the top of the conservation pool, the reservoir extends  up the Rio Grande,  up the Devils River, and  up the Pecos River.

About 56.2% of the water released from Amistad Dam is allocated to the United States, and 43.8% to Mexico. The IBWC determines the fraction of water stored in Amistad Reservoir belonging to either country on a biweekly basis, based on this allocation. The reservoir levels fluctuate greatly due to the region's highly variable annual precipitation as well as heavy water use.

Although the majority – about 70% – of the inflows to Amistad Reservoir comes from the Rio Grande, Devils, and Pecos Rivers, about 30% is from local springs. Inflows typically peak between August and October due to monsoon storms and hurricanes that strike the Gulf Coast.

Because of diversions of the Rio Grande in the upriver U.S. states of Colorado and New Mexico, the Rio Conchos (which originates in Chihuahua, Mexico) actually provides the majority of the water flowing from the Rio Grande into the lake. Increasing water use in upriver communities has caused a steady decline in Rio Grande flows throughout the 20th and 21st centuries and has led to concerns about future water levels and supplies at Amistad.

Power generation
The dam has two hydroelectric power stations, one on either side of the border, with a capacity of 66 megawatts (MW) each. The four generators have a capacity of 33 MW each and are powered by a 42,300-hp (31.54-MW) Francis turbine.

In 2009, the Amistad Dam plants produced a total of 296,734,000 kilowatt hours.

Border crossing

The Amistad Dam Port of Entry was built when Amistad Dam was completed in 1969.  The Dam was a bi-national effort to establish flood control on the Rio Grande and provide sources of water.  Although US Department of Transportation statistics combine traffic counts with Del Rio Texas Port of Entry, approximately 65,000 vehicles crossed the dam into the US in 2005.
The border station was rebuilt by the US Army Corps of Engineers in 2012.

Recreation
The dam and reservoir are part of the Amistad National Recreation Area.

See also

Falcon Dam

References

Links 

 Archival film footage of the Amistad Dam and Reservoir from the Texas Archive of the Moving Image

Dams in Texas
Dams in Mexico
Dams completed in 1969
Dams on the Rio Grande
Hydroelectric power plants in Texas
Hydroelectric power stations in Mexico
1969 establishments in Texas
1969 establishments in Mexico